Ádám Csobánki (born 24 August 1984) is a retired Hungarian football midfielder.

References

External links
 

1977 births
Living people
Footballers from Budapest
Hungarian footballers
Budapest Honvéd FC players
Kecskeméti TE players
Fehérvár FC players
Rákospalotai EAC footballers
Budaörsi SC footballers
Nemzeti Bajnokság I players
Association football midfielders